Yazgi-Yurt (Yaźğıyort) is a rural locality (a village) in Lagerevsky Selsoviet, Salavatsky District, Bashkortostan, Russia. The population was 259 as of 2010. There are 2 streets.

Geography 
Yazgi-Yurt is located 42 km northeast of Maloyaz (the district's administrative centre) by road. Lagerevo is the nearest rural locality.

References 

Rural localities in Salavatsky District